The Stage Debut Awards are theatre awards recognising individuals making their professional debuts in the performing arts in the UK. The annual ceremony was launched in 2017 by The Stage and include accolades for Best Performer in a Play, Best Writer, Best Designer and the Best West End Debut Performer. Recipients of these awards have gone on to star in West End shows (including Hamilton, & Juliet, Frozen and The Importance of Being Earnest), television series and films.

The awards ceremony is held annually at 8 Northumberland Avenue, London. In 2019, the awards relocated to a new venue, The Brewery, London.

In 2020, the Best Actor in a Play and Best Actress in a Play awards were updated to Best Performer in a Play and the Best Actor in a Musial and Best Actress in a Musical awards were updated to Best Performer in a Musical.

Judging Process 
Eligible nominees must be aged 16 or over, and making their professional debut in a named role in a production reviewed by The Stage. For acting roles this should be a first named role. The Stage's nationwide network of theatre critics put forward nominees from productions they have reviewed. Performers, writers, directors, designers and composers making their stage debut (and their agents) are also able to nominate themselves online for consideration. The public can also nominate individuals for each category.

Industry professionals from across the UK are then invited to give their input into the longlist. These advisors have included producer Danielle Tarento, casting director David Grindrod, David Jubb, Battersea Arts Centre, designer Es Devlin, Hannah Miller, Royal Shakespeare Company; James Grieve, Paines Plough; Jenny Sealey, Graeae; Jimmy Fay, Lyric Theatre; Laura Donnelly, National Theatre of Scotland; Madani Younis, Bush Theatre; director Michael Grandage; actor Noma Dumezweni, designer Paule Constable; Pravesh Kumar, Rifco; actor Preeya Kalidas; Sam Hodges, Nuffield Southampton Theatres; producer Sonia Friedman; Tom Morris, Bristol Old Vic; and Wendy Spon, National Theatre.

The judging panel decide on the shortlist and winners in all categories, except the Best West End Debut where the shortlist is voted on by the public. The Best West End Debut award recognises those who are making their professional debut in London's West End. This includes individuals who have previously made their debut outside of the West End.

Ceremony 
In 2017, the inaugural The Stage Debut Awards Ceremony took place at 8 Northumberland Avenue, London, on September 17.

The ceremony was hosted by West End leading man, Ben Forster. Categories Presenters included director Michael Grandage, actor Sharon D. Clarke, actor Rachel Tucker, Theatre owner Nica Burns, National Theatre director Rufus Norris and actor Kenneth Cranham. Exclusive performances at the ceremony were from Dreamgirls and the National Theatre's Follies.

In 2018, the ceremony took place on September 23 at 8 Northumberland Avenue, London. The ceremony was hosted by Cush Jumbo and the Category Presenters included director Michael Grandage, actor Ruthie Henshall, singer Preeya Kalidas, actor Jodie Prenger, and lighting designer Paule Constable. Exclusive performances at the ceremony were from Anaïs Mitchell and Miriam-Teak Lee.

In 2019, the ceremony took place at The Brewery, London, on September 15. The ceremony was hosted by Cush Jumbo, and the exclusive performances were by Rachel Tucker and Amara Okereke. Category Presenters included actor Giles Terera, actor Michael Xavier, singer Brenda Edwards, actor Janie Dee, actor Mark Gatiss, and playwright Inua Ellams.

The first digital ceremony was hosted as a free online event in 2020 by Miriam-Teak Lee (winner of Best Actress in a Musical in 2017) on 27 September and featured an exclusive performance was from SpitLip (winner of the 2019 Best Composer/Lyricist awards).

In 2021, no ceremony took place due to the Coronavirus pandemic.

In 2022, the ceremony will return as an in-person ceremony on Sunday, September 18.

Previous Winners

References 

British theatre awards
Awards established in 2017
2017 establishments in the United Kingdom